Lathi may refer to:
 Lathi, a long, heavy bamboo stick used by Indian police as a baton
 Lathi charge, a police tactic used to disperse crowds
 Lathi khela, a traditional Indian and Bangladeshi martial art of stick fighting

Geography
 Lathi, Gujarat, a city in India
 Lathi State, a former princely state
 Lathi (Vidhan Sabha constituency)

Film
 Lathi (1992 film), a Telugu-language Indian film
 Lathi (1996 film), a Bengali-language Indian film

See also
 Lahti, a city in Finland
 Lahti (surname)